N-Desmethylapalutamide is a nonsteroidal antiandrogen (NSAA) and the major active metabolite of apalutamide, an NSAA which is used as a hormonal antineoplastic agent in the treatment of metastatic prostate cancer. It has similar activity to that of apalutamide and, with apalutamide therapy, circulates at similar concentrations to those of apalutamide at steady state. N-Desmethylapalutamide is formed from apalutamide in the liver by the cytochrome P450 enzymes CYP2C8 and CYP3A4.

References

Benzamides
Fluoroarenes
Hormonal antineoplastic drugs
Human drug metabolites
Nitriles
Nonsteroidal antiandrogens
Pyridines
Spiro compounds
Trifluoromethyl compounds